Standings and results for Group 7 of the UEFA Euro 1984 qualifying tournament.

Group 7 consisted of Iceland, Malta, Netherlands, Republic of Ireland and Spain. The group winners were Spain, who won the group ahead of the Netherlands on goals scored following a 12–1 win over Malta.

Final table

Results

Goalscorers

References
UEFA Page
 RSSSF

See also
 Spain 12–1 Malta

Group 7
1982–83 in Spanish football
qual
1982–83 in Republic of Ireland association football
1983–84 in Republic of Ireland association football
1982–83 in Maltese football
1983–84 in Maltese football
1982 in Icelandic football
1983 in Icelandic football
1982–83 in Dutch football
1981–82 in Maltese football